Prem Nath Bazaz was a Kashmiri politician, scholar, and author born in Mattan, Kashmir. He was a secularist and a democrat. He was born to a Kashmiri Hindu family. He was a Kashmiri politician who founded two political parties, Kashmir Socialist Party, and Kisan Mazdoor Conference. He was the architect of the famous slogan "Kashmir belongs to Kashmiris", and was an ardent supporter of the Kashmir freedom movement till the end.
He has authored several books with Kashmir as the central theme. Some of these books include:
 Inside Kashmir (1941)
 The History of Struggle for Freedom in Kashmir: Cultural and Political, from the Earliest Times to the Present Day (1954)
 Daughters of the Vitasta: A History of Kashmiri Women from Early Times to the Present Day (1959)
 Democracy Through Intimidation and Terror: The Untold Story of Kashmir Politics (1978)
 Secular Morality: A Solvent of Contemporary Spiritual Crisis (1978)

lose comrade of Sheikh Mohammad Abdullah. However, he strongly differed with him on the accession of Kashmir with India. 
His books are widely quoted when discussing the history of Kashmir. In the preface of his book, the History of Struggle for Freedom in Kashmir, he wrote: "It is the voice of one who believes that the future of Kashmir, owing to its past traditions and culture, is inextricably linked with both her neighbours. But Kashmir belongs to Kashmiris and neither the Maharaja had, or any outsider has, however powerful he may be, any right to dictate about its future." 

Bazaz has a son, Bhushan who headed the "Jammu and Kashmir Democratic Forum".

References

Kashmiri people
Kashmiri Pandits
Writers about the Kashmir conflict
Kashmiri writers
People from Anantnag district

Further reading